Events in the year 1935 in Portugal.

Incumbents 
 President: Óscar Carmona
 Prime Minister: António de Oliveira Salazar

Events 
 17 February - Presidential election.

Arts and entertainment 
 4 August – Launch of Rádio e Televisão de Portugal
 4 August – First air date of the radio channel Antenna 1

Sports 
 Clube de Futebol Os Armacenenses founded
 Mira Mar SC founded

Births 
 25 January – António Ramalho Eanes, general and politician

Deaths 

 23 March; Ana de Castro Osório, writer, journalist, feminist and republican activist (born 1872)
 19 May; António Osório Sarmento de Figueiredo Jr., nobleman, jurist, politician and magistrate (born 1855)
 30 November; Fernando Pessoa writer/poet

References 

 
1930s in Portugal
Portugal
Years of the 20th century in Portugal
Portugal